Mzwandile Sisonkhe Mamba (16 July 1981 – 18 September 2010) was a Swazi footballer with the Royal Leopards of the Swazi Premier League. He won the footballer of the year in Swaziland for 2006–2007. He was also a key member of the Swaziland national football team.

His previous clubs include Mbabane Swallows.

Sources
 Angola Just A Point Away MTN African Football News, 15 June 2007

1981 births
2010 deaths
Swazi footballers
Eswatini international footballers
Mbabane Swallows players
Royal Leopards F.C. players

Association footballers not categorized by position